For Such a Time is the 2014 debut novel by Kate Breslin.

The novel was considered controversial because of its subject matter of a Jewish woman falling in love with the head of a Nazi concentration camp during World War II and then converting to Christianity.

Plot
In 1944, a blue-eyed, blonde Jewish woman, Hadassah Benjaminm, is saved from a firing squad and forced into service by Colonel Aric von Schmidt of the SS.  At a military camp in Czechoslovakia, Hadassah hides behind a false identity in order to survive as Colonel Aric’s secretary.

References

External links
Baker Publishing Group

2014 American novels
American romance novels
Christian novels
English-language novels
Novels set during World War II
2014 debut novels
Historical romance novels